A six-part referendum was held in Palau on 2 November 2004 alongside the country's general elections. Voters were asked questions on summoning a Constitutional Convention, payment of members of the National Congress, creating a unicameral Congress, term limits for Congress members, election of the President and Vice President and dual citizenship. All proposals were approved except the unicameral Congress, which despite receiving a majority of the public vote, did not meet the quorum of 12 of 16 states required for amendments to the constitution.

Results

Convening of a constitutional convention

Congressional attendance
Voters were asked whether they approved of a popular initiative to amend the constitution regarding the payment of members of the National Congress. The proposed amendment of article IX, section 8 would have read:

Unicameral parliament

Three-term limit for National Congress members
A popular initiative proposed amending the constitution to limit the number of terms a member of the National Congress could serve to three. The text would read:

Joint election of the president and vice president
A popular initiative proposed amending the constitution to elect the president and vice president together rather than separately. It would amend Article VIII, section 4 of the constitution to read:

Dual citizenship
A popular initiative proposed amending the constitution to allow Palauan citizens to hold dual citizenship, and give citizenship at birth to people with Palauan parents. The proposed wording was:

References

2004 referendums
2004 in Palau
Referendums in Palau
Constitutional referendums in Palau